Temporary maintenance holdings
Iceland
Road transport in Iceland